The European Masters is a professional ranking snooker tournament that has been staged periodically since 1989 as the European Open. Between 2005 and 2008 it was known as the Malta Cup and was the sole ranking tournament in Europe outside the British Isles, before being discontinued. In 2016, the event was resurrected and rebranded the European Masters.

History 
Before the 1988/89 season, there were no ranking events outside the United Kingdom. There were, however, many successful invitation events, so the World Professional Billiards and Snooker Association decided to extend the tour with some overseas events. The first two were held in Canada and mainland Europe. The first European event was the European Open in 1988 in Deauville, France, with the sponsorship of ICI. The event then was held at the Palais des Sports in Lyon, France, for 1992 and at the Imax Centre in Rotterdam, Netherlands with the sponsorship of Tulip Computers.

The event was then moved to Belgium. It was held in Tongeren in 1992 and Antwerp between 1993 and 1994 with sponsorship from Humo. The event was moved to the first half of the season in 1993/1994, thus there were two events in 1993, in February and December. The event was moved back to its original place in the calendar in 1995/1996 and took place in Valletta, Malta between 1996 and 1997. The event was not held in the next four seasons. In the 1999/2000 season the Malta Grand Prix was the only continental European ranking event and in 2000/2001 there were none for the first time in 13 seasons.

The European Open was revived in 2001/2002 and was held in Valletta, Malta. In 2003 the event was held in England for the first time (Torquay). The following year it returned to Malta, this time held in Portomaso. The following season event was renamed the Malta Cup. The 2006 event was the first ranking tournament, where no English player reached the quarter-finals. It became an invitation event in 2007/2008, but it was discontinued afterwards.

In 2016, it was announced that the event would be revived under the name European Masters in Romania for the next three years. However, in 2017 it was announced that the tournament would be held in Belgium that year. In 2020, it was held in Milton Keynes, due to the Coronavirus pandemic. The 2022 event will be held at the same venue, after COVID-19 rates in Bavaria prevented it from being held at the Stadthalle in Fürth. The final was traditionally played as a best-of-17 frames match, but for 2022, it was extended to a best-of-19.

There has been four maximum breaks in the history of the tournament. Alain Robidoux made the first in the first qualifying round of the 1989 event against Jim Meadowcroft. The second was Shaun Murphy's fifth official maximum break, which he compiled in the second qualifying round of the 2016 event against Allan Taylor. The third and fourth came at the qualifying stage of the 2022 event. On 16 July, Zhang Anda made a maximum break during his 5–1 win over Anton Kazakov; the following day, Hossein Vafaei made a maximum as he defeated Ng On-yee by the same score. It was the first time either player had made a 147 in professional competition.

Winners

See also
 Malta Grand Prix
 Irish Open
 Antwerp Open
 2013 Rotterdam Open
 German Masters
 Paul Hunter Classic

References 

 
Recurring sporting events established in 1989
1989 establishments in France
Snooker in Malta
Snooker in Europe
Snooker ranking tournaments
Snooker non-ranking competitions